Virgil Leo Green (born August 3, 1988) is a former American football tight end. He played college football at Nevada and was drafted by the Denver Broncos in the seventh round of the 2011 NFL Draft.

Early years
Green is a graduate of Tulare Union High School, where he played on the Redskins football team. He totaled 61 receptions for 1,014 yards (16.6 avg.) with 12 touchdowns during his career at Tulare, where he earned first-team All-East Yosemite League honors following his senior season. He had 13 catches for 245 yards and four touchdowns in a single game. In addition to football, he lettered four years in basketball and participated in track & field.

College career
Green played 50 career games (34 starts) at the University of Nevada and totaled 72 receptions for 939 yards (13.0 avg.) with 11 touchdowns while helping the Wolf Pack rank fifth in the nation with 500.2 total yards per game from 2007–2010. He recorded a personal-best 35 catches for 515 yards (14.7 avg.) with five touchdowns in his senior campaign to earn first-team All-Western Athletic Conference honors. He was named the Nevada Strength and Conditioning Athlete of the Year as a junior in the 2009 season in addition to being selected to the All-WAC second-team.

College statistics

Professional career

Green was considered to be a top tight end prospect for the 2011 NFL Draft.  At the 2011 NFL Combine, he was the top tight end performer in the broad jump and vertical jump categories. Green was chosen in the seventh round with the 204th overall pick in the 2011 NFL Draft by the Denver Broncos.

Denver Broncos
As a rookie, Green had a limited role behind the main starter Daniel Fells and Julius Thomas. He started three games and recorded three receptions for 24 yards on the 2011 season.

In March 2012, Green was suspended for four games after failing a drug test. Green then began taking prescribed medication for ADHD before receiving approval from the NFL. He remained in a limited role on the offense behind Joel Dreessen and Jacob Tamme. He recorded two starts and five receptions for 63 yards.

In the 2013 season, Green started three games and recorded nine receptions for 45 yards.

On December 28, 2014, Green scored his first career touchdown reception, which was from quarterback Brock Osweiler, in a 47–14 win against the Oakland Raiders in Week 17. On the 2014 season, he finished with six receptions for 74 yards and one touchdown on nine starts.

On March 10, 2015, the Broncos re-signed Green to a three-year, $8.4 million contract. In Week 2, against the Kansas City Chiefs, he scored a one-yard touchdown from Peyton Manning on Thursday Night Football. On the 2015 season, he started five games and finished with 12 receptions for 173 yards and one receiving touchdown.

On February 7, 2016, Green played on the Broncos team that won Super Bowl 50. In that Super Bowl, the Broncos defeated the Carolina Panthers by a score of 24–10.

In the 2016 season, Green started 11 games and finished with 22 receptions for 237 yards and one receiving touchdown.

On September 17, 2017, in Week 2 against the Dallas Cowboys, Green had two receptions for 11 yards and a touchdown in the 42–17 victory. In the 2017 season, he started all 16 games and finished with 14 receptions for 191 yards and one receiving touchdown.

Los Angeles Chargers
On March 14, 2018, Green signed a three-year, $8.6 million contract. The deal includes a $2.4 million signing bonus and $5.9 million guaranteed with the Los Angeles Chargers. In Week 5, against the Oakland Raiders, he scored his first receiving touchdown as a Charger. In the 2018 season, he finished with 19 receptions for 210 receiving yards and one receiving touchdown. In the Divisional Round of the AFC Playoffs, Green caught a one-yard receiving touchdown in the 41–28 loss to the New England Patriots.

In the 2019 season, Green finished with nine receptions for 78 receiving yards and one receiving touchdown.

In Week 7 of the 2020 season against the Jacksonville Jaguars, Green suffered an ankle injury while catching a 26-yard touchdown pass and was placed on injured reserve on October 29, 2020. He finished the 2020 season with three receptions for 50 yards and one touchdown in six games.

Professional statistics

References

External links

1988 births
Living people
People from Tulare, California
Players of American football from California
Sportspeople from Tulare County, California
American football tight ends
Nevada Wolf Pack football players
Denver Broncos players
Los Angeles Chargers players